Rems-Murr is a Landkreis (district) in the middle of Baden-Württemberg, Germany. Neighboring districts are (from north clockwise) Heilbronn, Schwäbisch Hall, Ostalbkreis, Göppingen, Esslingen, the district-free city Stuttgart and the district Ludwigsburg.

History
The district was created in 1973 when Waiblingen was merged with most of the district Backnang and a few municipalities from the district Schwäbisch Gmünd.

Geography
The largest part of the district is located in the Swabian-Franconian Forest (Schwäbisch-Fränkischer Wald), of which the Mainhardt Forest forms a part. The two rivers Rems and Murr gave the district its name.

Coat of arms
The coat of arms shows a deer antler in the middle, the symbol of the former state of Württemberg. The two wavy blue lines above and below symbolize the two rivers Murr (in the north) and Rems (in the south) after which the district was named.

Twinning
Rems-Murr-Kreis is twinned with:
   Southampton, United Kingdom, (since 1991)

Cities and towns

References

External links

 Official website (German)

 
Stuttgart (region)
Districts of Baden-Württemberg